Elections to Brighton and Hove City Council election will take place on 4 May 2023, alongside other local elections in England and Northern Ireland. Due to a boundary review there has been a change in ward boundaries, however the city council will retain 54 members of the council.

Background

The outcome of the 2019 election in the city saw the Labour Party form a minority administration, with support from the Green Party of England and Wales. This shifted following resignations and expulsions of councillors from the Labour Party- leading to the Green Party forming the administration.

In 2022 a lot of the selection process from major parties and political groupings in Brighton began. Of the 16 Labour councillors, 7 announced that they are standing down at the next election. This includes the current co-leaders of the Labour group Carmen Appich and John Allcock and previous leaders Nancy Platts and Daniel Yates.

Three by-elections took place in the city prior to the election. The third took place 5 May 2022- alongside the 2022 local elections- was triggered by the resignation of the Conservative councillor in the ward. Labour won the seat. In February, it was reported in the Argus that independent councillor Bridget Fishleigh aimed to run an 'Brighton and Hove Independent' slate at the next election.  In the May 2022, her bloc treated their candidate as a test of the interest, which the Labour Party won.

The city council has had a review of the boundaries of wards. There will be 23 wards across the council, an increase of two, and only five wards remain the same. The council will maintain 54 council seats.

References

2023 English local elections
2023
May 2023 events in the United Kingdom
2020s in East Sussex
Future elections in the United Kingdom